Call of Duty is a first-person shooter video game series franchise.

Call of Duty may also refer to:
 Call of Duty (video game), the first video game in the series
 Call of Duty (book), the memoirs of Lynn Compton
 The Call of Duty (comics), a series of short-lived Marvel Comics
 Commandos: Beyond the Call of Duty, expansion pack of Commandos: Behind Enemy Lines